Dubensky or Dubyonsky (masculine), Dubenskaya or Dubyonskaya (feminine), or Dubenskoye or Dubyonskoye (neuter) may refer to:
Zakhar Dubensky (b. 1978), Russian soccer player
Dubensky District, name of several districts in the countries of the former Soviet Union
Dubensky (inhabited locality) (Dubenskaya, Dubenskoye), name of several rural localities in Russia